Haim "Jumes" Oron (born 26 March 1940) is an Israeli politician and former Minister of Agriculture. He was head of the political party Meretz, for whom he served as a member of the Knesset.

Biography
Oron was born in Givatayim and grew up in Ramat Gan. His parents emigrated from Poland before World War II. His father was a textile worker and his mother a housewife. His nickname as a boy was "Jamus" (water buffalo) and later, "Jumes" (sycamore fruit).

Oron served in the Israel Defense Forces with the airborne Nahal unit. During his military service, he and his wife Nili joined kibbutz Lahav, where he taught in the high school and worked in various branches of the kibbutz economy (poultry, field crops, sausage factory, plastics factory). He was a member of the kibbutz committee and served as executive secretary. In 1968, he became secretary of the Hashomer Hatzair movement. He was national secretary of Kibbutz Artzi twice.
 
Oron had five children - Irit, Uri, Yaniv, Assaf and Oded. Yaniv died in a tractor accident at the age of 4. Oron and his wife continue to live on the kibbutz, and his benefits as an ex-Knesset member and ex-Minister go into the collective treasury.

Political career
Oron was one of the founders of Peace Now (1978). In 1988, he was voted to the Knesset for Mapam which in 1992 merged with Ratz and Shinui as Meretz. In the thirteenth Knesset, he was chairman of the Ethics Committee. In the fourteenth Knesset, he became the leader of Meretz.

He joined Haim Ramon in his bid for the Histadrut leadership, and after Ramon's victory, during 1995-1996, served as its treasurer. In 1999, Oron was appointed Minister of Agriculture in Ehud Barak's government. In 2000, he resigned from the Knesset, but returned after the 2003 elections.

After Yossi Beilin resigned as Meretz leader, Oron was elected as party chairman. He headed the party's list in the 2009 elections on 10 February, but saw the party reduced to just three seats. On 14 February 300 Meretz members signed a petition urging Oron to resign, while a second petition signed by 400 other party members, including Shulamit Aloni and Yossi Beilin, called for him to stay. The next day, Oron said he decided not to resign, saying: "For me, responsibility means working toward the rehabilitation of Meretz".

In early 2011 Oron announced he would quit Knesset within few months, before formally resigning his seat on 23 March.

Activism
Oron has embarked on several projects to improve the welfare of the Bedouin population of the Negev, among them the establishment of a wastewater purification plant, a health clinic and nursery schools. He is known for his ties with Marwan Barghouti, now serving five life terms in an Israeli jail for terrorist activities. Qadura Fares, a senior Fatah official, describes Oron as a "loyal friend" and a "loyal Zionist," but also attentive to the problems of the Palestinians.

Oron was one of the initiators of the Geneva Accord, together with Yossi Beilin.

He is the Laureate of the 2005 "Quality in Government Award"

References

External links

1940 births
People from Givatayim
Jews in Mandatory Palestine
Israeli people of Polish-Jewish descent
Israeli educators
Israeli LGBT rights activists
Living people
Kibbutz Movements secretaries
Kibbutzniks
Mapam leaders
Meretz leaders
Members of the 12th Knesset (1988–1992)
Members of the 13th Knesset (1992–1996)
Members of the 14th Knesset (1996–1999)
Members of the 15th Knesset (1999–2003)
Members of the 16th Knesset (2003–2006)
Members of the 17th Knesset (2006–2009)
Members of the 18th Knesset (2009–2013)
Ministers of Agriculture of Israel